Szekely aircraft engines were three-cylinder radial engines built in Holland, Michigan in the 1920s and 30s.  They were used to power small aircraft such as the Rearwin Junior, Taylor H-2 and American Eagle Eaglet.  Often criticized for reliability issues and design flaws, many were replaced with better engines in their original airframes.  Few examples still exist but a museum quality example is on display in the Holland Museum in Holland, Michigan.

Variants
Data from:Jane's all the World's Aircraft 1931
SR-3 OOverhead valve combustion chamber, compression ratio 4.6:1,  at 1,750 rpm.
SR-3 LSide-valve combustion chamber, compression ratio 5:1,  at 1,750 rpm.

Applications
American Eagle Eaglet
Buhl Bull Pup
Curtiss-Wright Junior
Lambach HL.1
Nicholson Junior KN-2
Prest Baby Pursuit
Rearwin Junior
Taylor H-2

Specifications (SR-3 Model O)

See also

References

External links
"Szekely SR-3 L" Old Rhinebeck Aerodrome, retrieved October 30, 2007

1920s aircraft piston engines
Aircraft air-cooled radial piston engines